Tyrone Phillips (born 5 January 1994) is a Fiji international rugby league footballer who plays as a  and er for the Newtown Jets in the Canterbury Cup NSW.

Background
Phillips was born in Sydney, New South Wales, Australia. He is of Fijian and Indigenous Australian descent.

He played his junior rugby league for La Perouse United. He was then signed by the South Sydney Rabbitohs.

Playing career

Early career
From 2011 to 2013, Phillips played for the South Sydney Rabbitohs' NYC team, scoring 24 tries in 46 matches. In November 2013, he signed a 2-year contract with the Canterbury-Bankstown Bulldogs starting in 2014. He played for the Bulldogs' NYC team in early 2014, before moving on to the Bulldogs' New South Wales Cup team in the same year. On 3 May 2014, he played for the New South Wales under-20s team against the Queensland under-20s team.

2015
On 2 May, Phillips played for Fiji against Papua New Guinea in the 2015 Melanesian Cup, making his international debut off the interchange bench in Fiji's 22-10 win at Cbus Super Stadium. In Round 11 of the 2015 NRL season, he made his NRL debut for the Bulldogs against the Canberra Raiders. On 27 September, he was named on the wing in the 2015 New South Wales Cup Team of the Year. On 3 November, he re-signed with the Bulldogs on a 2-year contract.

2017
On 9 November 2017, Phillips signed a one year contract with the Penrith Panthers for the 2018 season.

2018
In round 9 of the 2018 NRL season against the North Queensland Cowboys, Phillips made his debut for the Panthers, starting on the wing and scored 2 tries in the Panthers' 20-26 loss at Carrington Park at Bathurst.

2019

On 31 March, Phillips was charged with a mid-range drink-driving offence. 

On 30 June, Phillips was a late inclusion for Canterbury Cup NSW club Newtown in their Round 15 clash against former team, the Canterbury-Bankstown Bulldogs.  Phillips scored a try in the match which was won by Canterbury-Bankstown 40-28 at ANZ Stadium.

Phillips played for Newtown in their Canterbury Cup NSW grand final victory over the Wentworthville Magpies at Bankwest Stadium.  Phillips was involved in the lead up play for the match winning try which was scored in the 88th minute during extra-time.

References

External links

Penrith Panthers profile
Canterbury Bulldogs profile

1994 births
Living people
Australian people of I-Taukei Fijian descent
Australian rugby league players
Canterbury-Bankstown Bulldogs players
Fiji national rugby league team players
Indigenous Australian rugby league players
Penrith Panthers players
Rugby league centres
Rugby league fullbacks
Rugby league players from Sydney
Rugby league wingers